Carex pilulifera, the pill sedge, is a European species of sedge found in acid heaths, woods and grassland from Macaronesia to Scandinavia. These stalks bend as the seeds ripen, and the seeds are collected and dispersed by ants of the species Myrmica ruginodis.

Varieties:
 Carex oederi var. oederi (synonym: Carex scandinavica E.W.Davies)

Description

The rhizomes of C. pilulifera are very short, giving the plant a caespitose (densely tufted) appearance. The tussock grows outwards through the production of annual side-shoots.

The inflorescence comprises a single, terminal, male (staminate) spike, and 2–4 lateral female (pistillate) spikes. The female spikes are attached directly to the stem, and each is subtended by a bract which does not form a sheath.

Distribution and ecology
Carex pilulifera has a wide distribution in Europe, extending from Macaronesia and the Balkan Peninsula to Scandinavia. It grows on acidic substrates including heathland, grassland and woodland. It typically inhabits soils with a pH of 4.5–6.0.

As the seeds of C. pilulifera ripen, the culms bend, and can eventually touch the ground. The seeds are then dispersed by ants, particularly Myrmica ruginodis, in a process known as myrmecochory, and are eaten by other insects, such as the ground beetle Harpalus fuliginosus.

Taxonomic history
Carex pilulifera was described by Carl Linnaeus in his 1753 work Species Plantarum, which marks the starting point of botanical nomenclature. The specific epithet  means "bearing small globular structures", in reference to the female spikes.

References

External links

pilulifera
Flora of Europe
Flora of Macaronesia
Plants described in 1753
Taxa named by Carl Linnaeus